Kyle Michael Dempsey (born 17 September 1995) is an English professional footballer who plays as a midfielder for Bolton Wanderers.

Early life
Dempsey was born in Whitehaven, Cumbria. His father Michael Dempsey played rugby league professionally for Workington Town and he nearly followed his father into the sport, having played for youth sides at Wigan Warriors before electing to pursue a career in professional football.

Career
Dempsey made his first-team debut for Carlisle United on 28 January 2014 in a 3–0 win over Milton Keynes Dons. Dempsey scored 11 goals on top of 10 assists in his first professional season. He was named as Carlisle's Player of the Year for the 2014–15 season.

He signed for Championship club Huddersfield Town on 10 July 2015 for an undisclosed fee on a three-year contract. He made his debut as an 83rd-minute substitute in a 2–0 defeat against Hull City at the KC Stadium on 8 August 2015. His first league start came in their 2–2 draw against Reading at the Madejski Stadium on 3 November 2015. His first goal for the club came in a 4–2 defeat against Brentford at Griffin Park on 19 December 2015.

On 29 August 2016, with his chances limited at Huddersfield, Dempsey joined League One club Fleetwood Town on a season-long loan. He signed for the club permanently on a three-year contract on 19 May 2017.

Dempsey joined Fleetwood's League One rivals Peterborough United on 7 January 2019 on loan until the end of the 2018–19 season.

On 17 August 2020, Dempsey joined League One club Gillingham and was made captain for the 2020-21 season. He was named team captain the following month. Dempsey attracted interest and an offer in the January 2021 transfer window, but Gillingham turned the offer down and Dempsey remained at the club.

Dempsey joined Bolton Wanderers on 31 January 2022 for a fee around £150,000.

On 1 March 2023 at Carlisle Crown Court, Dempsey admitted an assault on a Maryport doorman on 16 July 2022 and, along with his father, was granted unconditional bail ahead of sentencing on 11 April 2023.

Style of play 
Dempsey has been utilised as a "deeper-lying number eight to a number 10 behind the front two", describing himself as a "goal-scoring midfielder" who "likes to receive the ball around the halfway line and drive with the ball and bring everyone else into play".

Career statistics

Honours
Individual
Carlisle United Player of the Year: 2014–15
Fleetwood Town Young Player of the Year: 2016–17
Gillingham Player of the Year: 2020–21

References

External links

1995 births
Living people
Sportspeople from Whitehaven
English footballers
Association football midfielders
Carlisle United F.C. players
Huddersfield Town A.F.C. players
Fleetwood Town F.C. players
Peterborough United F.C. players
Gillingham F.C. players
Bolton Wanderers F.C. players
English Football League players
Footballers from Cumbria